The 1977 Yugoslavian motorcycle Grand Prix was the seventh round of the FIM 1977 Grand Prix motorcycle racing season. It took place on 19 June 1977 at the Opatija Circuit. The event was marred by two fatalities, and this turned out to be the last Yugoslavian motorcycle Grand Prix at Opatija. The event moved to the further inland Rijeka Circuit.

Race summary
The event took place under heavy rumors of it being cancelled because of the existing safety conditions of the seaside Opatija street circuit. The Yugoslavian Grand Prix promoters had received an ultimatum from the FIM before the race that, if they did not improve the safety of the circuit, the event would be canceled. Despite the circuit's scenic setting, it was an unsafe race track due to high speeds on narrow roads coupled with numerous unmovable roadside obstacles, such as trees, stone walls, lampposts, electric poles, embankments, houses, and the Adriatic Sea.

The safety conditions at the Opatija Circuit had previously been protested by competitors in 1973 when, in the aftermath of the deaths of Jarno Saarinen and Renzo Pasolini at the Monza round, several racing teams including Yamaha, Harley Davidson and MV Agusta, boycotted the event due to unsafe track conditions. Other riders chose to compete, but with less than their full efforts. In the 1974 Yugoslavian Grand Prix, British rider Billie Nelson crashed into the crowd during the 250cc race, injuring several spectators. Nelson died later that night at a hospital.

The 1977 Grand Prix turned into a disaster when Italian rider, Giovanni Ziggiotto, crashed during practice for the 250cc race when his motorcycle's engine seized and he was hit from behind by Per-Edward Carlson. He died four days later in a hospital. During the 50 cc race, Ulrich Graf crashed when his bike developed a rear tire puncture and he was thrown into a rock wall. He suffered serious head injuries and died later in a hospital. The tragedy forced the venue off the Grand Prix schedule and the Yugoslavian Grand Prix was moved to the Rijeka Circuit for the 1978 season.

350 cc classification

250 cc classification

125 cc classification

50 cc classification

References

Yugoslav motorcycle Grand Prix
Yugoslavian
Motorcycle Grand Prix
1977 in Yugoslav sport
Motorsport in Croatia